Lauren Christy is a British singer, songwriter and record producer. Originally a solo artist, she found success as part of the writing production trio the Matrix. The Matrix received numerous Grammy nominations including best producer.

Biography 
Christy studied at the Bush Davies Ballet School as a child, before she decided to become a musician.

Career 
By age nineteen, Christy had become a solo recording artist. She was signed to EMI Publishing and achieved a recording contract with Polygram Mercury records. In 1994, she received an American Music Awards nomination for Best New Artist. Her song "The Color of the Night" also garnered her a Golden Globe nomination for Best Song in an Original Motion Picture.

Five years later, Christy moved into production as co-creator of the Matrix. Alongside creative partners, Christy's then-husband Graham Edwards and Scott Spock, the trio wrote and produced Avril Lavigne's debut album Let Go which included three international number one hits – "Complicated", "Sk8er Boi" and "I'm With You" – selling 20 million copies. "Complicated" led to the Matrix trio winning the Ivor Novello Award for International Hit of the Year, and they garnered seven Grammy nominations – including Song of the Year in 2003 for "Complicated" and again in 2004 for "I'm With You" along with Producer of the Year. Christy is also a two-time Juno award winner and a BMI Songwriter of the Year Award recipient.

The Matrix has worked with artists such as Avril Lavigne, Jason Mraz, Shakira, Korn, David Bowie, Christina Aguilera, Britney Spears, Hilary Duff, Busted, Tokio Hotel and Rihanna.

Her recent solo songwriting work includes Enrique Iglesias's "Tonight I'm Loving You", Kelly Clarkson – "I Forgive You", Jason Derulo – "Breathing"; Leona Lewis – "Your Hallelujah"; Ricky Martin – "Liar"; Chris Brown – "Time For Love"'; Jamie Foxx – "Baby's In Love"; Dua Lipa – "Blow Your Mind Mwah"; Bebe Rexha – "I Got You" and "Busted".

In 2014, she was nominated for a Grammy for her work on Chris Brown's song, "Time For Love" on the album "X", nominated for Urban Contemporary Album of the Year.

In 2016, she gained further recognition with her credits on G Eazy and Bebe Rexha's "Me, Myself and I". Christy has written Iggy Azalea's first single "Team" that was released on 18 March 2016, as well as winner of The Voice Jordan Smith's first single "Stand in the Light".

In 2019, she worked in collaboration with Korn on three songs included in their 2019 release "The Nothing". The titles include, "Cold", "Gravity of Discomfort", and "H@rd3r".

Discography 
Albums
Lauren Christy (Mercury Records, 1993)
Breed (Mercury, 1997)

Soundtrack appearances
"The Color of the Night", from Color of Night (1994)
"Breed", from Batman & Robin (1997)
"Walk This Earth Alone", from Great Expectations (1998)
"My Spot in the World", from 102 Dalmatians (2000)

References

External links 

Interview, HitQuarters Jul 06

Year of birth missing (living people)
Living people
English women singer-songwriters
English record producers
Musicians from London
British women record producers